Elana Toruń was a Polish football club based in Toruń.  Before dissolving, the team competed in the III liga, 4th tier of the Polish football league system.

History

The team was at the 2nd level of the Polish pyramid in the 1990s, but were relegated in 1998/99. During the following season the club changed their name to TKP Torun, but they were relegated again to the 4th level. The club were often referred to as Torunski KP, but by the 2007/08 season they had returned to their original name of Elana Torun and were back playing in the Polish 3rd level.

Supporters 

Elana fans are commonly known as Elanowcy and include an ultras group of around 100-1000 (depending on match) fanatical supporters. Apart from Toruń, there are fan-clubs in Gniewkowo, Golub-Dobrzyń, Ostaszewo, Aleksandrów Kujawski, Ciechocinek, Kowalewo Pomorskie, Obrowo, Lubicz and Wąbrzeźno.

They have a long-standing friendship with fans of Ruch Chorzów and KS Myszków (who are also Ruch fans), friendly relations with Widzew Łódź fans from Grudziądz, and more recently Wisła Kraków and KKS Kalisz fans.

As the city of Toruń has a rivalry with Bydgoszcz that extends even beyond sport, Elana competes the Cuiavian derby with Zawisza and Polonia. They also compete with fans of speedway club Apator Toruń.

References

External links 

  
  Elana Toruń at torunskaelana.futbolowo.pl
  Elana Toruń at elanowcy.pl
  Elana Toruń at facebook.com
  Elana Toruń (90minut.pl)

Football clubs in Poland
Association football clubs established in 1968
1968 establishments in Poland
Sport in Toruń